Jan Galle (1600–1676) was a Flemish engraver, a son and pupil of Theodoor Galle, was born at Antwerp, and died there in 1676.

Among his plates are:

The Wise and Foolish Virgins; after Marten de Vos.
Twelve plates of Old Testament History.
Christ surrounded by the Instruments of His Passion.
The fat Cook and the thin Cook; after P. Brueghel the elder.
Lubricitas Vitae Humanae; after the same. 1553.
Judith giving the Head of Holofernes to a Slave; after H. Goltzius.

References

 

1600 births
1676 deaths
Flemish engravers
Artists from Antwerp